Jane Barlow (17 October 1856 – 17 April 1917) was an Irish writer, noted for her novels and poems describing the lives of the Irish peasantry, chiefly about Lisconnel and Ballyhoy, in relation to both landlords and the Great Famine.

Life 
Barlow was the second child and eldest daughter of Rev. James William Barlow, vice-provost of Trinity College, Dublin. Born in Dollymount,  Clontarf, County Dublin, she spent most of her life living in Raheny, then a village in County Dublin, in the house in the townland of Ballyhoy which then was called "The Cottage":

She was educated by the family's governess and her father. She became proficient in French and German, and was a talented classical scholar and an accomplished pianist. She travelled much throughout Ireland, and in her twenties visited Italy, France, Greece, and Turkey. 

"Miss Barlow" had great success with the collection of stories Irish Idylls (1892). Running into nine editions, it was read in France, Germany, Britain and America. When the University of Dublin first began to grant degrees to women, Barlow was one of the first "to receive the highest honorary distinction that ancient seat of learning could bestow", a Doctor of Letters (D. Litt.).  She was a contributor to the National Literary Society in Dublin and was friends with Katharine Tynan and Sarah Purser, who painted her portrait in 1894.

After the death of her father in 1913 she and her siblings moved to Bray, County Wicklow. By this time she was suffering from poor health and low spirits, but she continued with her writing. She died in Bray, on 17 April 1917. In its glowing obituary (18 April, 1917) The Irish Times reported nothing of her health, nor a cause of death.

Barlow was a member of the Society for Psychical Research for more than 25 years. Shortly before her death, she was elected to its Committee of Reference and Publication.

Works 
Barlow published under her own name and under the pseudonym Felix Ryark. She co-wrote with her father under the pseudonym Antares Skorpios. Barlow's novels and poetry collections include:

 History of a World of Immortals Without a God (McGee, 1891), as Antares Skorpios
 Bog-land Studies (Unwin, 1892)
 Irish Idylls (Hodder & Stoughton, 1892) — went into nine editions
 The End of Elfintown (Macmillan, 1894) — fairy poetry illustrated by Laurence Housman, 
 Kerrigan's Quality (Hodder & Stoughton, 1894) — with 8 illustrations
 The Battle of the Frogs and Mice (Methuen, 1894) — illustrations by Francis Donkin Bedford
 Strangers at Lisconnell, a Second Series of Irish Idylls (1895)
 Maureen's Fairing, and Other Stories (Dent, 1895) — illustrations by Bertha Newcombe
 Mrs. Martin's Company, and Other Stories (Dent, 1896)
 A Creel of Irish Stories (Methuen, 1897)
 From the East unto the West (Methuen, 1898)
 From the Land of the Shamrock (Methuen, 1900) — short stories
 Ghost-Bereft, with Other Stories and Studies in Verse (Smith, Elder & Co., 1901)
 The Founding of Fortunes (Methuen, 1902) 
 By Beach and Bog Land (Unwin, 1905)
 Irish Neighbours (Hutchinson, 1907)
 The Mockers, and Other Verses (Allen, 1908)
 A Strange Land (Hutchinson, 1908), as Felix Ryark — a "lost race" tale
 Irish Ways (Allen, 1909) — illustrations by Warwick Goble
 Mac's Adventures (Hutchinson, 1911) — dedicated to Algernon Charles Swinburne
 Flaws, a Novel (Hutchinson, 1911)
 Doings and Dealings (Hutchinson, 1913)
 Between Doubting and Daring (Blackwell, 1916)
 In Mio's Youth (Hutchinson, 1917)

In the United States, Barlow's works were published by Dodd, Mead & Co.

Death 

Barlow died on the 17th of April, 1917, in Bray. She is buried with her father, mother and one of her sisters at Mount Jerome Cemetery, Dublin.

References

External links 
 
 
 
 
  – her father

1856 births
People from Clontarf, Dublin
People from Raheny
19th-century Irish writers
20th-century Irish writers
19th-century Irish women writers
20th-century Irish women writers
19th-century Irish novelists
20th-century Irish novelists
Irish women novelists
Irish women poets
1917 deaths